Central Florida is a region of the U.S. state of Florida.

Central Florida may also refer to:
University of Central Florida in Orlando, Florida
UCF Knights, that university's athletics program
College of Central Florida, a state college in Ocala, Florida